Schreckensteinia is a moth in the family Schreckensteiniidae.

Species
 Schreckensteinia erythriella Clemens, 1860
 Schreckensteinia felicella Walsingham, 1880
 Schreckensteinia festaliella Hübner, 1819
 Schreckensteinia inferiorella Zeller, 1877
 Schreckensteinia jocularis Walsingham, 1914

References

Schreckensteinioidea
Moth genera
Taxa named by Jacob Hübner